Michael J. Deas (born 1956) is an American painter and illustrator. He designed 16 commemorative stamps for the United States Postal Service, featuring the images of James Dean, Marilyn Monroe, Humphrey Bogart, Carey Grant, Edgar Allan Poe and other people. Deas was awarded five medals by the Society of Illustrators, including two gold medals for U.S. postage stamp illustrations. He painted the iconic Columbia Pictures logo, and also worked for Reader’s Digest, Random House and Chiat/Day.

In addition to his artwork, Deas is a noted authority on Edgar Allan Poe. His 1989 book, The Portraits & Daguerreotypes of Edgar Allan Poe, published by the University of Virginia, documents over 70 historic images of the poet and is now considered a standard reference work. In 2004, Deas was consulted by the Edgar Allan Poe Society of Baltimore and was instrumental in identifying a Poe daguerreotype, stolen from the Hampden-Booth Theatre Library, that appeared on Antiques Roadshow.

Selected works

Earthbound (cover art) by Richard Matheson
Interview with the Vampire (cover art) by Anne Rice
Legends of Hollywood series
Time Magazine (cover art), Special Issue, July 7, 2003

References

External links
Official website
PBS documentary on Deas' American Postal Stamps
Michael J. Deas, Art of the Stamp, Smithsonian National Postal Museum
[https://www.nola.com/homegarden/2009/09/post_65.html Quarters' lighting is perfect for artist Michael Deas, The Times-Picayune]
Entry from KnowLA (Encyclopedia of Louisiana)

20th-century American painters
American male painters
21st-century American painters
21st-century American male artists
American illustrators
1956 births
Living people
20th-century American male artists